Naomh Mearnóg is a Gaelic Athletic Association club in the parish of Portmarnock, County Dublin, Ireland. The club was founded in 1975 and now fields a total of 35 teams in football, hurling, camogie and ladies' football. These include three adult football teams, two adult hurling teams, two adult camogie teams and an adult ladies' football team. They also cater for many juvenile teams.

History

Early years
In the late 1920s and early 1930s, there were two grades of adult inter-club football: senior and junior. It was the same at inter-county level. However, the interest in inter-county football was nothing like it is nowadays, most of the focus was on the inter-club scene.

In the late 1920s, there was a temporary break-up of Innisfails' junior football team in Balgriffin, and as a result it was decided to form a team in Portmarnock. At that time, Portmarnock would have been what is now called 'Old Portmarnock'. The population was sparse and if a team lost a few players it found it very difficult to survive. The team was named St. Marnocks after a contemporary of St. Patrick, who first introduced Christianity to Portmarnock. The team wore a black jersey with an amber sash, the colours of which were inspired by the crest of the Jameson family, of whiskey fame, who lived locally.

Success came to the newly formed team quite quickly. In their first year of competition, they were runners-up in Division 3 of the Fingal League. In the following years, they won the Fingal League Division 1 on two occasions and the Fingal Championship once. During those years, 7-a-side tournaments were very popular and drew huge crowds to the venues. St. Marnocks were beaten in extra time by St. Margarets in the final of the Swords tournament played on a Monday in August 1930. They won the Fintan Lalor tournament, beating Erins Isle in the final. This final was played at ‘The Thatch’, where the present Catholic Church stands in Whitehall. Quite often, St. Marnocks travelled to their ‘away’ games by train. The Club Secretary would fill in a form by the Thursday before the game and the team consequently travelled at a reduced rate.

As early as 1935, St. Marnocks were unable to field a team against Innisfails, who were back playing again, at Brian Boru Park. St. Marnocks had won the game by 1–1 to 0–1 but Innisfails were objecting to them being awarded the points because the list of players supplied by St. Marnocks contained only 14 names. The game was refixed for the following Sunday in Parnell Park. St. Marnocks were already in danger of breaking up. As things worked out they did not break up and Innisfails went on to reach the final of the Dublin Junior Football Championship only to be beaten by St. Pauls by 1–3 to 0–3. The following September, St. Marnocks beat the reigning Dublin Junior Football Champions, St. Pauls, in the semi-final of the Loving Cup by 1–4 to 0–2.

The greatest achievement of this team was beating Fingallians in the final of 1936 Dublin Junior Football Championship in Parnell Park. This promoted the club to senior ranks but they played very few games at this level. The reason for this was they lost three of their key players: Gilsenan, Michael Reilly and Tom Tighe, all from Malahide. The team did not remain senior for very long after that. The team that lined out in the Junior Final was: J. McManus, F. Morris, J. Brady, N. Morton, J. Rafferty, J. Connor, F. Donnelly, T. McLernon, M. Reilly, D. Fitzgerald, P. French, T. Tighe, E. Kealy, M. Gilsenan and J. Fogarty.

St. Marnocks' home games were played at different venues during those years:
 A field behind Freaney’s house in Old Portmarnock.
 The site of the old St. Anne’s Church.
 The site of the present St. Anne’s Church. (By sheer coincidence the newly formed Naomh Mearnóg played many of their early games on the same site.)

Other clubs that St. Marnocks would have played against during those years were: Pioneers (Balbriggan), Ballyboughal, St. Maurs, Parnells, Wild Geese, Peadar Mackens (Ringsend), St. Laurences (Howth) and many others.

Naomh Mearnóg Re-launch
At the relaunch of the club, chaired by Mr. Leo Nealon, some members of the Dublin panel including Jimmy Keaveney, David Hickey and Robbie Kelleher were present. The club was not officially registered with Dublin County Board during that first year. The first year, under the chairmanship of Paddy Doherty, was spent putting the club on a proper footing in terms of organising football and hurling at adult level and putting a juvenile structure in place with the co-operation of St. Marnock's National School. In 1975, St. Helen's National School did not exist, nor was there a community school in existence.

Having made the initial breakthrough, it was deemed appropriate to have the club affiliated to the County Board. The first proper meeting of the club was held on 29 January 1976 at the North Coast Hotel. Paddy Doherty chaired that meeting with Jackie Hughes acting as Secretary and his brother-in-law Éanna Mac Cába acting as Treasurer. Records show that that meeting was attended by Frank McNulty, Patsy Haran (later to become Lord Mayor of Portmarnock), Danny McCormick, Vincent Hughes, Mícheál Ó Braonáin, Jim Carroll, Eugene Keaveney, the Hanley brothers, Tom, Pat and Jack, Pat Keaveney (Principal of St. Marnock's School), Christy Dwyer, Tony Jordan, Pat Dillon and Robert Kenny as well as the five original founding members. The meeting was also attended by Liam Price of Naomh Maur, who was later to become chairman of the Fingal Football Board. Éanna Mac Cába, as acting Treasurer, reported to the meeting that the club's finances were in a healthy state, showing a credit balance of £27 made up of subscriptions from Jackie Hughes, Brother O’Fearghail (Coláiste Mhuire), Ray Burke T.D. and Shay Corrigan. In the course of his report, the Secretary in waiting reported that the visit of the Dublin team to the parish, in 1974, proved very valuable. The meeting decided that a football and hurling team be registered with the County Board under the name St. Marnocks.

At this meeting, Patsy Haran commenced his long and distinguished career in football management when he was chosen to manage the club's adult football team. Eugene Keaveney was selected team Captain and Pat Dillon was chosen as Vice-Captain. Robert Kenny was selected as trainer of this team. Selectors on the junior football side were to be Danny McCormick, Jackie Hughes and Vincent Hughes. This first meeting set up a Finance Committee with the following members: Tom Farrelly, Pat Keaveney, Brendan Shannon, Martin McDonagh and Frank McNulty. A juvenile committee was also set up to organise underage games in the club under the auspices of the following: Frank McNulty, Patsy Haran, Mícheál Ó Braonáin, Pat Keaveney and Christy Dwyer.

On the playing side, two teams were registered at under 11 and under 13 in the Dublin Football League. This historic event took place on 25 February 1976. Just over a month later, on 29 March, an adult hurling team was formed with John Joe Lane selected as team Manager with Danny McCormick and Vincent Hughes as Selectors. Dermot Kennedy was selected as Captain with Jim Carroll (he of Camogie fame) as Vice-Captain. Also, notable players are Oliver Freaney. Oliver came into prominence as a very versatile and solid corner back. At the age of 25 he cooped an award for player of the year for 2018.

In May 1976, Fr. Philips was appointed Club President, a position he held until his departure some years later to Ballymun. Two years later, Dublin County Council made 2 pitches available to the club at Carrickhill, Portmarnock.

Modern Naomh Mearnóg
Naomh Mearnóg has some of the best facilities available in any GAA club in Ireland, covering almost . There is a modern clubhouse containing dressing rooms, club bar, function hall, handball alley, gym, catering facilities, meeting rooms and club shop. There are three adult pitches, a flood lit AstroTurf pitch, a juvenile pitch, training areas and a hurling wall. The two county council pitches in Carrickhill are also still in use.

The club made history on 19 September 2009, when the Senior A camogie team won the club's first ever Dublin Senior Championship title, beating Good Counsel 1–10 to 1–8 in the final.

The club grounds were officially named "Páirc Mhearnóg" in 2010 to mark the tenth anniversary since the clubhouse was built.

In 2019 the Adult Men's Football team won promotion to Division 1 of the League.

In 2019 the U21 Hurlers won the U21C Championship.

In 2020 the Adult Men's Hurling Team won the Dublin Intermediate Hurling Championship.

Notable players (Past and Present)

Senior inter-county footballers
 Dublin
 Kevin O'Brien
 Shane Ryan
 Shane Carthy

Senior inter-county hurlers
 Dublin 
 Shane Ryan

Senior inter-county camogie players
 Dublin
 Catriona Power
 Laura Twomey
 Miriam Twomey

Senior inter-county ladies' footballers
  
 Clíodhna O'Connor

Honours

Football
 Dublin Intermediate Football Championship:
 1996
 Dublin Junior Football Championship:
 1936, 2004
 Dublin Under 21 C Football Championship: 
 2009, 2016
 Dublin AFL Div. 10
 2011

Hurling
  Dublin Intermediate Hurling Championship:
 2020 , 2022
 Dublin Junior Hurling Championship:
 1995

 U21 ‘C’ Hurling Championship 2019

Camogie
 Dublin Senior A Camogie Championship: 1
 2009
 Dublin Senior B Camogie Championship: 1
 1999
 Dublin Junior B Camogie Championship: 1
 2005
 Dublin Junior C Camogie Championship: 1
 1990
 Dublin Senior B Camogie League: 1
 1999
 Dublin Intermediate Camogie League: 2
 2002, 2007
 Dublin Junior A Camogie League: 1
 1991
 Dublin Junior C Camogie League: 1
 1990
 Orla Ryan Shield: 2
 2005, 2006
 Dublin Intermediate Open Cup: 2
 2002, 2007

References

External links
CLG Naomh Mearnóg
Dublin Club GAA
Dublin GAA
GAA Official Website

Gaelic games clubs in Fingal
Hurling clubs in Fingal
Gaelic football clubs in Fingal
Camogie clubs in County Dublin